McDonald County is a county located in the southwestern corner of the U.S. state of Missouri. As of the 2010 census, the population was 23,083. Its county seat is Pineville. The county was organized in 1849 and named for Sergeant Alexander McDonald, a soldier in the American Revolutionary War. The county has three sites on the National Register of Historic Places, including the Old McDonald County Courthouse and the Powell Bridge.

Geography

Adjacent counties
Newton County (north)
Barry County (east)
Benton County, Arkansas (south)
Delaware County, Oklahoma (west)
Ottawa County, Oklahoma (northwest)

Major highways
 Interstate 49
 U.S. Route 71
 Route 43
 Route 59
 Route 76
 Route 90

Demographics

As of the census of 2000, there were 21,681 people, 8,113 households, and 5,865 families residing in the county. The population density was 40 people per square mile (16/km2). There were 9,287 housing units at an average density of 17 per square mile (7/km2). The racial makeup of the county was 89.66% White, 0.18% Black or African American, 2.88% Native American, 0.14% Asian, 0.14% Pacific Islander, 3.70% from other races, and 3.30% from two or more races. Approximately 9.36% of the population were Hispanic or Latino of any race. 28.0% were of American, 11.5% German, 10.5% Irish and 6.6% English ancestry.

There were 8,113 households, out of which 35.70% had children under the age of 18 living with them, 57.60% were married couples living together, 9.60% had a female householder with no husband present, and 27.70% were non-families. 23.30% of all households were made up of individuals, and 9.10% had someone living alone who was 65 years of age or older. The average household size was 2.65 and the average family size was 3.11.

In the county, the population was spread out, with 28.90% under the age of 18, 8.70% from 18 to 24, 28.60% from 25 to 44, 22.60% from 45 to 64, and 11.30% who were 65 years of age or older. The median age was 34 years. For every 100 females, there were 102.60 males. For every 100 females age 18 and over, there were 99.50 males.

The median income for a household in the county was $27,010, and the median income for a family was $31,530. Males had a median income of $23,434 versus $18,157 for females. The per capita income for the county was $13,175. About 15.60% of families and 20.70% of the population were below the poverty line, including 28.60% of those under age 18 and 17.20% of those age 65 or over.

2020 Census

Education

Public schools
McDonald County R-I School District - Anderson
Noel Primary School (PK-02) - Noel
Pineville Primary School (PK-02) - Pineville
Anderson Elementary School (PK-05) - Anderson
Noel Elementary School (03-08) - Noel
Pineville Elementary School (03-08) - Pineville
Rocky Comfort Elementary School (PK-08) - Rocky Comfort
Southwest City Elementary School (PK-08) - Southwest City
White Rock Elementary School (PK-08) - Jane
Anderson Middle School (06-08) - Anderson
McDonald County R-I High School (09-12) - Anderson

History of McDonald County R-I School District
The present McDonald County R-I School District is the result of consolidations of several county school districts. The first two school districts to consolidate were the Pineville and Anderson school districts. This was the first step in what was a long-range plan to combine all of the remaining high schools in the county with the exception of the Goodman School District which would become a part of the Neosho school system. The plan for the Pineville–Anderson consolidation was approved and the state offered a $50,000 matching grant for the building of a new high school. If the remaining high schools were to have joined, an additional $200,000 in matching grants would have been recurred.

The first consolidated class from Pineville and Anderson was the Class of 1966. David Alumbaugh was a member of that class and remembers it was the class that elected the school mascot as the mustang and the school colors of red and black. There was not a new high school so each town maintained a high school faculty but all activities including athletics were combined. When asked what the mood of the people in Pineville was concerning the school consolidation, Alumbaugh said, "I don't remember it being a great deal; most people considered it inevitable it was going to happen sooner or later." It was something that could not be stopped, according to Larry Warner who taught during the first year (1966) at the Pineville campus and then at the new high school in Anderson its next year. "It was something that was really needed. The faculty at the old Pineville High School was not very good either at the end of their careers or just beginning. The kids got along fine at the new school but it was the parents who fought."

The next school district to consider joining Pineville and Anderson was the Noel School District. Noel Lawmen had a serious concern on where the new high school, which would serve all students, would be located. The proposed site was about a mile east of the city of Anderson at the junction of Highway 76 and then new Highway 71. The Noel patrons wanted a site more close to the center of the county which would be just north of the Indian River Bridge at the city of Lanagan. The Noel School Board sent a letter to the Missouri Department of Elementary & Secondary Education calling for a vote of the people of McDonald County on the site but this didn't happen. The reasoning for there not being a countywide vote couldn't be found, but the proposed new high school site had already been approved by the Missouri Department of Education.
......
Once a school district was asked to be included in the reorganized district the people of the district asked to be included and the people of the reorganized district both voted. What this meant was that the people of Pineville and Anderson could vote in other districts even if that other district's patrons didn't want to come into the reorganized district, they had to. This led to many of the hard feelings that last even today in McDonald County about the school consolidation. With the addition of Noel to the reorganization there were only the high schools of Goodman, Rocky Comfort and Southwest City left. The school district of Goodman decided to join the school district of Neosho. This left Southwest City with its school population of 89 and Rocky Comfort with its high school population of 107 as the only other two schools left in the county. Southwest City, located only miles from the Arkansas and Oklahoma borders, had no other choice. There were no Missouri schools close to it so it asked and was voted into the reorganized plan. Rocky Comfort is located on the eastern edge of McDonald County and would have been much closer to reorganize with the town of Wheaton in Barry County. Rocky Comfort ended up joining the reorganization of the McDonald County schools.

Public libraries
McDonald County Library

Politics

Local
The Republican Party predominantly controls politics at the local level in McDonald County. Republicans hold all but one of the elected positions in the county.

State

All of McDonald County is a part of Missouri's 159th district in the Missouri House of Representatives and is represented by Bill Lant (R-Pineville).

All of McDonald County is a part of Missouri's 29th District and is currently represented in the Missouri Senate by David Sater (R-Cassville).

Federal

All of McDonald County is included in Missouri's 7th Congressional District and is represented by Billy Long (R-Springfield) in the U.S. House of Representatives.

Political culture

Like most counties situated in Southwest Missouri, McDonald County is a Republican stronghold in presidential elections. George W. Bush carried McDonald County in 2000 and 2004 by more than two-to-one margins, and like many other rural and exurban counties throughout Missouri, McDonald County strongly favored John McCain over Barack Obama in 2008. Despite the strength of Republicans at the presidential level here, Democrat Jimmy Carter did manage to carry McDonald County in 1976, making it the only county in Southwest Missouri to have been won by any Democrat in the past 50 years.

Like most areas throughout the Bible Belt in Southwest Missouri, voters in McDonald County traditionally adhere to socially and culturally conservative principles which tend to strongly influence their Republican leanings. In 2004, Missourians voted on a constitutional amendment to define marriage as the union between a man and a woman—it overwhelmingly passed McDonald County with 84.42 percent of the vote. The initiative passed the state with 71 percent of support from voters as Missouri became the first state to ban same-sex marriage. In 2006, Missourians voted on a constitutional amendment to fund and legalize embryonic stem cell research in the state—it failed in McDonald County with 57.02 percent voting against the measure. The initiative narrowly passed the state with 51 percent of support from voters as Missouri became one of the first states in the nation to approve embryonic stem cell research. Despite McDonald County's longstanding tradition of supporting socially conservative platforms, voters in the county have a penchant for advancing populist causes like increasing the minimum wage. In 2006, Missourians voted on a proposition (Proposition B) to increase the minimum wage in the state to $6.50 an hour—it passed McDonald County with 76.37 percent of the vote. The proposition strongly passed every single county in Missouri with 78.99 percent voting in favor as the minimum wage was increased to $6.50 an hour in the state. During the same election, voters in five other states also strongly approved increases in the minimum wage.

Missouri presidential preference primary (2008)

Former Governor Mike Huckabee (R-Arkansas) received more votes, a total of 1,285, than any candidate from either party in McDonald County during the 2008 Missouri Presidential Primaries.

Communities

Cities and Towns
Anderson
Ginger Blue
Goodman
Jane
Lanagan
Noel
Pineville (county seat)
Southwest City

Unincorporated Communities

 Arnett
 Bethpage
 Caverna
 Cove
 Coy
 Cyclone
 Erie
 Hart
 Havenhurst
 Jacket
 Longview
 May
 McNatt
 Pack
 Powell
 Rocky Comfort
 Simcoe
 Splitlog
 Tiff City

See also
 McDonald Territory
 National Register of Historic Places listings in McDonald County, Missouri

References

Further reading
 Sturges, J. A. Illustrated history of McDonald County, Missouri : from the earliest settlement to the present time (1897) online

External links
McDonald County
Digitized 1930 Plat Book of McDonald County  from University of Missouri

 
1849 establishments in Missouri
Populated places established in 1849